Ingrid Tørlen (born July 21, 1979 in Ålesund) is a Norwegian female beach volleyball player. Her beach volleyball partner since 2002 has been Nila Håkedal. The pair competed in the 2004 Summer Olympics in Athens, Greece where they placed 22nd.

Playing partners
 Nila Håkedal
 Cecilie Josefsen
 Janne Kongshavn

References

External links 
  Site of Ingrid Tørlen and Nila Håkedal
 Olympic Profile

1979 births
Living people
Norwegian beach volleyball players
Women's beach volleyball players
Olympic beach volleyball players of Norway
Beach volleyball players at the 2004 Summer Olympics
Beach volleyball players at the 2008 Summer Olympics
Sportspeople from Ålesund